M. Kannappan is an Indian politician and former  Union minister for Non-conventional energy sources in A. B. Vajpayee's NDA rule between 1999 and 2004 Member of the Legislative Assembly of Tamil Nadu. He was elected to the Tamil Nadu legislative assembly as a Dravida Munnetra Kazhagam candidate from Kinathukadavu constituency in 1967, and 1972 elections.

He was a minister for Hindu religious endowment boards and dairy development in the government of Tamil Nadu between 1969 and 1975. He was re-elected to cabinet in 1989 when DMK returned to power as Cabinet minister for Highways, Housing and Ports. He was also the state Transport minister in M. Karunanidhi's government. He was instrumental in reviving the DMK in western Tamil Nadu after it lost elections in the 1980s. In 1994, he had a disagreement relating to the Vaiko issue with Karunanidhi, following which he left the DMK to form a new party, the MDMK. He unsuccessfully contested the Singanallur constituency in the 1996 elections but won in 1999 when fighting the Thiruchengode parliament constituency. He became union cabinet minister forging an alliance with the BJP. In 2006,he again returned to state politics and won the Thondamuthur constituency in Coimbatore district. He defeated former union minister and State congress legislative party leader S. R. Balasubramaniam.

Kannappan is often referred as "karotti kannappan" as he was the only person to come out boldly and take along Karunanidhi during all emergency periods when all of Karunanidhi's men even feared to talk in public. In mid-2008, when Karunanidhi was ill in hospital, the two men reconciled and Kannappan rejoined the DMK. and from Palladam constituency in 1989 election. He was elected as a Marumalarchi Dravida Munnetra Kazhagam from Thondamuthur constituency in 2006 election.

Personal life
M. K. Muthu, a son of Kannappan, followed his father into politics as a DMK member. Kannappan's grandson Nandha is a popular actor who acted in films such as Mounam Pesiyathe and Eeram.

References

Dravida Munnetra Kazhagam politicians
Union Ministers from Tamil Nadu
Living people
Lok Sabha members from Tamil Nadu
India MPs 1999–2004
People from Namakkal district
Year of birth missing (living people)
Tamil Nadu MLAs 1967–1972
Tamil Nadu MLAs 1971–1976
Tamil Nadu MLAs 1989–1991
Tamil Nadu MLAs 2006–2011